Zinc-alpha-2-glycoprotein is a protein that in humans is encoded by the AZGP1 gene.

This gene expresses a soluble protein that stimulates lipolysis, induces a reduction in body fat in mice, is associated with the cachexia related to cancer, and is known to be expressed in secretory cells of lung epithelium. In 2009, it was found that smoking increases expression of this gene, which is why smoking cessation leads to weight gain. Zinc-alpha-2-glycoprotein levels also rise with onset of Diabetes 2, which accounts for weight loss thereafter.

References

External links

Further reading